Sleep Has Her House is a 2017 experimental film shot, written, produced, directed, and edited by Welsh filmmaker, Scott Barley. Like several of his previous short films, Sleep Has Her House was shot on an iPhone. It also features still photography and hand drawn images by the artist.

The film is considered part of the slow cinema movement due to its use of long takes; the longest of which is 11 minutes long, featuring the sun setting until dusk. The film features no actors or dialogue.

Synopsis 
“The shadows of screams climb beyond the hills.

It has happened before.

But this will be the last time.

The last few sense it, withdrawing deep into the forest.

They cry out into the black, as the shadows pass away, into the ground.” — Opening text from Sleep Has Her HouseIn a world seemingly devoid of human beings and inhabited by only a select few animals, an undefined presence manifests, embodied as the wind. It passes through the valley, lake, and the woods, leaving only mysterious deaths in its wake. As the night creeps in, the supernatural forces at work transcend into the natural, with apocalyptic consequences.

Production 
Sleep Has Her House was directed by Scott Barley, who was also the film's producer, cinematographer, sound designer and editor. It was independently produced through his production company, Ether Films. Sleep Has Her House was not originally made for film festivals or the internet. The film's first draft cut had a duration of four hours, and was planned as an installation where audience members would be welcome to - in the director's own words - "take a nap" during its screening. Barley eventually decided to rework the film into a more condensed, consumable form for the internet and later for festivals, but has not ruled out releasing a longer cut in the future.

Principal photography was shot on an iPhone, and took place during 2015 and 2016 in Wales and Scotland, with post-production being completed alongside ongoing production for sixteen months. Some of the sequences in the film consist of up to sixty separate shots invisibly stitched together in post-production, that in some cases took months to render.

The film was completed in December 2016.

Reception

Critical response 
Despite a niche audience, the film has received acclaim. In early 2017, it was nominated best "overlooked film" by film critic, Dustin Chang, in IndieWire's 2016 critic's poll, although this was before its official release. James Slaymaker of Mubi Notebook wrote, "Like the great Jean-Marie Straub, Scott Barley creates striking images by returning us to the basics of cinema, the natural world, but abstracting it through profilmic means by reducing the landscape to pure, basic forms [...] If Sleep Has Her House at first calls to mind the expressionist landscapes of Peter Hutton, Victor Sjöström, and Jean-Marie Straub, the formal apocalypse of its final act recalls the smeary digital cacophony of Lucien Castaing-Taylor and Véréna Paravel's Leviathan. By removing his filmmaking from any traditional sense of narrative, character, and, even temporal/spatial unity, Barley invites us to see the world—and the cinematic image—anew. Sleep Has Her House is a vital reminder that the most potent visual abstractions can be created through something as simple as the shifting colour of the sky reflected in water, and the most jarring shock can come from a change in lens." Upon watching the film, American novelist, Dennis Cooper wrote, "I realised how very long it had been since a new film both filled me with absolute wonder and satisfied my deepest cravings for cinema itself. It made me ask myself, 'Where am I?' in the most precise and hopeful way." For the Canadian premiere, film critic, Josh Cabrita wrote in The Georgia Straight, "Barley has more in common with Caspar David Friedrich than any contemporary avant-gardist, finding the terrible sublime through grand footage shot on nothing less than an iPhone."

Influential American experimental filmmaker, Phil Solomon wrote of the film, "There are moments within Sleep Has Her House of such exquisite and subtle rendering of ‘moving light in place’ that I have always dreamed of experiencing in the cinema. A black forest film to be entered into only with great care and caution [...] Scott Barley has dared us to imagine a cinema of such fragile - and terrifying - beauty (reclaiming once again that real definition of 'awesome', the sublime) that places both the film and the viewer on equal footing of corporal existence by the closing credits."

The film was later nominated in Sight & Sounds best films of 2017 poll. In casting his vote, writer and film critic, Tom Charity described the film as, "The single most momentous hour and a half in the dark this year, a tenebrous landscape film shapeshifting between reality and nightmare, cinema and dream."

In early 2018, Sleep Has Her House was nominated for best film, best first feature, and best director in The Village Voice 2017 Film Poll. 

In 2020, film historian, Nicole Brenez cited Sleep Has Her House as one of the best films of the decade.

In 2022, the film received two votes as one of the ten greatest films of all time in the Sight and Sound‘s decennial world poll.

Accolades 
Sleep Has Her House was awarded Best Film by the official jury at the Fronteira International Documentary & Experimental Film Festival in Goiânia, Brazil.

References

External links
 

2010s avant-garde and experimental films
2017 films
British avant-garde and experimental films
Slow movement
Mobile phone films
2010s English-language films
2010s British films
Apocalyptic films
Films set in forests
Films shot in Scotland
Films shot in Wales